The 2018 WNBA season was the 22nd season for the Los Angeles Sparks of the Women's National Basketball Association. The season tipped off on May 20th.

The Sparks started out strong with a 4–1 record in May.  They won their season opener in a re-match of the 2017 WNBA Finals against the Minnesota Lynx.  They continued their strong run into June where the team posted an 8–4 record.  The Sparks won 6 of 7 to start the month.  Two of their June losses game to the eventual WNBA Champion Seattle Storm.  However, things started to get shaky in July.  The Sparks went 4–6.  However, all but one loss came to eventual playoff teams.  The other loss was to Indiana, who ended the season with the worst record.  The Sparks finished with a 4–4 record in August, including 3–0 at home.  However, the Sparks lost 4 of their last 5 (again all against playoff teams).

Their final record of 19–15 was good enough to secure the 6th seed in the 2018 WNBA Playoffs.  They met the Lynx in the first round, in a re-match of the last three WNBA Finals.  The Sparks prevailed 75–68 at the Staples Center.  In the second round, they faced the Washington Mystics in Washington, but were defeated 64–96 to end their season.

Transactions

WNBA Draft

Trades/Roster Changes

Roster

Game log

Preseason

|- style="background:#fcc;"
| 1
| May 7
| @ Connecticut
| L 65–68
| Thomas (17)
| Thomas (8)
| Pondexter (3)
| Mohegan Sun Arena
| 0–1
|- style="background:#fcc;"
| 2
| May 8
| vs. New York
| L 75–81
| Pondexter (17)
| Wiese (9)
| Pondexter (5)
| Mohegan Sun Arena1,106
| 0–2
|- style="background:#bbffbb;"
| 3
| May 12
| China
| W 82–61
| Gray (17)
| Carson (5)
| Gray (10)
| Hutto-Patterson Gym1,650
| 1–2

Regular season 

|- style="background:#bbffbb;"
| 1
| May 20
| @ Minnesota
| W 77–76
| Sims (21)
| Ogwumike (9)
| Gray (8)
| Target Center13,032
| 1–0
|- style="background:#bbffbb;"
| 2
| May 22
| @ Indiana
| W 87–70
| Ogwumike (25)
| Ogwumike (10)
| Gray (8)
| Bankers Life Fieldhouse4,742
| 2–0
|- style="background:#fcc;"
| 3
| May 24
| @ Connecticut
| L 94–102
| Gray (21)
| Tied (4)
| Sims (7)
| Mohegan Sun Arena5,571
| 2–1
|- style="background:#bbffbb;"
| 4
| May 27
| Phoenix
| W 80–72
| Gray (23)
| Ogwumike (8)
| Gray (8)
| Staples Center11,201
| 3–1

|- style="background:#bbffbb;"
| 5
| June 3
| Minnesota
| W 77–69
| Parker (19)
| Parker (10)
| Gray (6)
| Staples Center13,500
| 4–1
|- style="background:#fcc;"
| 6
| June 7
| Seattle
| L 63–88
| Ogwumike (19)
| Ogwumike (6)
| Sims (5)
| Staples Center9,204
| 4–2
|- style="background:#bbffbb;"
| 7
| June 10
| Chicago
| W 77–59
| Parker (24)
| Ogwumike (8)
| Sims (5)
| Staples Center8,239
| 5–2
|- style="background:#bbffbb;"
| 8
| June 12
| Atlanta
| W 72–64
| Parker (18)
| Ogwumike (10)
| Gray (7)
| Staples Center9,215
| 6–2
|- style="background:#bbffbb;"
| 9
| June 15
| @ Washington
| W 97–86
| Parker (23)
| Parker (7)
| Parker (11)
| Capital One Arena5,289
| 7–2
|- style="background:#bbffbb;"
| 10
| June 17
| @ Chicago
| W 81–72
| Gray (21)
| Tied (11)
| Gray (6)
| Wintrust Arena5,584
| 8–2
|- style="background:#bbffbb;"
| 11
| June 19
| Indiana
| W 74–55
| Parker (15)
| Ogwumike (7)
| Gray (7)
| Staples Center8,857
| 9–2
|- style="background:#fcc;"
| 12
| June 22
| @ Dallas
| L 72–101
| Ogwumike (17)
| Parker (6)
| Parker (6)
| College Park Center5,672
| 9–3
|- style="background:#bbffbb;"
| 13
| June 24
| New York
| 80–54
| Williams (25)
| Ogwumike (10)
| Gray (11)
| Staples Center9,203
| 10–3
|- style="background:#bbffbb;"
| 14
| June 26
| Dallas
| W 87–83
| Parker (29)
| Vadeeva (6)
| Parker (7)
| Staples Center10,002
| 11–3
|- style="background:#fcc;"
| 15
| June 28
| @ Seattle
| L 72–81
| Parker (27)
| Parker (11)
| Parker (3)
| KeyArena8,447
| 11–4
|- style="background:#fcc;"
| 16
| June 29
| @ Las Vegas
| L 78–94
| Gray (22)
| Vadeeva (7)
| Beard (6)
| Mandalay Bay Events Center5,124
| 11–5

|- style="background:#bbffbb;"
| 17
| July 1
| Las Vegas
| W 87–71
| Lavender (17)
| Ogwumike (7)
| 3 Tied (6)
| Staples Center12,003
| 12–5
|- style="background:#fcc;"
| 18
| July 3
| Connecticut
| L 72–73
| Ogwumike (20)
| Parker (8)
| Parker (4)
| Staples Center6,280
| 12–6
|- style="background:#fcc;"
| 19
| July 5
| @ Minnesota
| L 72–83
| Parker (22)
| Ogwumike (8)
| Gray (8)
| Target Center9,303
| 12–7
|- style="background:#fcc;"
| 20
| July 7
| Washington
| L 74–83
| Gray (23)
| Ogwumike (13)
| Ogwumike (5)
| Staples Center10,163
| 12–8
|- style="background:#bbffbb;"
| 21
| July 10
| @ Seattle
| W 77–75 (OT)
| Parker (21)
| Tied (9)
| Parker (10)
| KeyArena9,686
| 13–8
|- style="background:#fcc;"
| 22
| July 12
| Dallas
| L 77–92
| Parker (21)
| Parker (7)
| Gray (5)
| Staples Center13,502
| 13–9
|- style="background:#bbffbb;"
| 23
| July 15
| @ Las Vegas
| W 99–78
| Parker (34)
| Parker (11)
| Parker (9)
| Mandalay Bay Events Center4,810
| 14–9
|- style="background:#fcc;"
| 24
| July 20
| Indiana
| L 76–78
| Parker (24)
| Parker (12)
| Parker (7)
| Staples Center10,532
| 14–10
|- style="background:#bbffbb;"
| 25
| July 22
| @ Chicago
| W 93–76
| Parker (23)
| Parker (12)
| Gray (9)
| Wintrust Arena6,477
| 15–10
|- style="background:#fcc;"
| 26
| July 24
| Atlanta
| L 71–81
| Gray (18)
| Parker (9)
| Parker (5)
| Staples Center9,324
| 15–11

|- style="background:#bbffbb;"
| 27
| August 2
| Minnesota
| W 79–57
| Parker (23)
| Parker (10)
| Gray (9)
| Staples Center9,542
| 16-11
|- style="background:#bbffbb;"
| 28
| August 5
| Phoenix
| W 78–75
| Gray (24)
| Parker (14)
| Parker (8)
| Staples Center19,076
| 17-11
|- style="background:#bbffbb;"
| 29
| August 8
| @ New York
| W 82–81
| Gray (19)
| Parker (8)
| Parker (6)
| Westchester County Center2,481
| 18-11
|- style="background:#fcc;"
| 30
| August 9
| @ Atlanta
| L 73–79
| Parker (20)
| Parker (12)
| Tied (4)
| McCamish Pavilion4,235
| 18-12
|- style="background:#fcc;"
| 31
| August 12
| @ Phoenix
| L 78–86
| Parker (23)
| Parker (8)
| Sims (6)
| Talking Stick Resort Arena10,618
| 18-13
|- style="background:#bbffbb;"
| 32
| August 14
| New York
| W 74–66
| Gray (26)
| Parker (10)
| Gray (5)
| Staples Center11,067
| 19-13
|- style="background:#fcc;"
| 33
| August 17
| @ Washington
| L 67–69
| Williams (14)
| Tied (8)
| Parker (7)
| Capital One Arena7,400
| 19-14
|- style="background:#fcc;"
| 34
| August 19
| @ Connecticut
| L 86–89
| Parker (20)
| Parker (10)
| Gray (7)
| Mohegan Sun Arena8,040
| 19-15

Playoffs

|- style="background:#bbffbb;"
| 1
| August 21
| Minnesota
| W 75–68
| Gray (26)
| Parker (6)
| Gray (6)
| Staples Center8,598
| 1–0

|- style="background:#fcc;"
| 1
| August 23
| @ Washington
| L 64–96
| Parker (16)
| Parker (8)
| 3 Tied (3)
| Capital One Arena3,548
| 1–1

Standings

Playoffs

Statistics

Regular season

Awards and honors

References

External links

Los Angeles Sparks seasons
Los Angeles
Los Angeles Sparks